Alabama's 3rd congressional district is a United States congressional district in Alabama that elects a representative to the United States House of Representatives. It is based in east central Alabama and encompasses portions of Montgomery and the entirety of Calhoun, Chambers, Cherokee, Clay, Cleburne, Lee, Macon, Randolph, Russell, St. Clair, Talladega, and Tallapoosa counties.

The district takes in some of the city of Montgomery. Other cities in the district include  Phenix City, Talladega, Tuskegee and Auburn. At the federal level, the district is fairly Republican-leaning, albeit not as strongly as many of the other districts in the state. John McCain carried the district in 2008 with 56.21% of the vote while Barack Obama clinched 43.04% of the vote.

The district is currently represented by Republican Mike Rogers and was once represented by Bob Riley, the former Governor of Alabama.

Election results from statewide races

List of members representing the district

Recent election results
These are the results from the previous ten election cycles in Alabama's 3rd district.

2002

2004

2006

2008

2010

2012

2014

2016

2018

2020

2022

See also

Alabama's congressional districts
List of United States congressional districts

References
Specific

General
 
 
 Congressional Biographical Directory of the United States 1774–present

External links
CNN coverage of the 2000 election
CNN coverage of the 2002 election
CNN coverage of the 2004 election
CNN coverage of the 2006 election

03
Calhoun County, Alabama
Chambers County, Alabama
Cherokee County, Alabama
Clay County, Alabama
Cleburne County, Alabama
Coosa County, Alabama
Lee County, Alabama
Macon County, Alabama
Montgomery County, Alabama
Randolph County, Alabama
Talladega County, Alabama
Tallapoosa County, Alabama
Russell County, Alabama
Constituencies established in 1823
1823 establishments in Alabama
Constituencies disestablished in 1841
1841 disestablishments in Alabama
Constituencies established in 1843
1843 establishments in Alabama
Constituencies disestablished in 1861
1861 disestablishments in Alabama
Constituencies established in 1868
1868 establishments in Alabama
Constituencies disestablished in 1963
1963 disestablishments in Alabama
Constituencies established in 1965
1965 establishments in Alabama